Zuzanna Czyżnielewska (born 24 April 1992) is a Polish volleyball player. She was part of the Poland women's national volleyball team.

She participated in the  2012 FIVB World Grand Prix.

On club level she played for SMS PZPS Szczyrkd.

References 

1992 births
Living people
Polish women's volleyball players
Place of birth missing (living people)